Migael Pretorius (born 24 March 1995) is a South African cricketer. He is a right-handed batsman and right-arm medium bowler. He made his List A debut for Northerns against North West on 13 December 2015. He was the leading wicket-taker in the 2016–17 Sunfoil 3-Day Cup, with a total of 42 dismissals in ten matches.

In August 2017, he was named in Durban Qalandars' squad for the first season of the T20 Global League. However, in October 2017, Cricket South Africa initially postponed the tournament until November 2018, with it being cancelled soon after. He made his Twenty20 debut for Northerns in the 2017 Africa T20 Cup on 1 September 2017.

In June 2018, he was named in the squad for the Highveld Lions team for the 2018–19 season. In September 2018, he was named in North West's squad for the 2018 Africa T20 Cup. In September 2019, he was named in North West's squad for the 2019–20 CSA Provincial T20 Cup.

In December 2020, Pretorius was added to South Africa's Test squad for their series against Sri Lanka. In March 2021, Pretorius was named in South Africa's Twenty20 International (T20I) squad for their series against Pakistan. In April 2021, he was named in Free State's squad, ahead of the 2021–22 cricket season in South Africa.

References

External links
 

1995 births
Living people
South African cricketers
Northerns cricketers
North West cricketers
People from Vereeniging
Free State cricketers